The Argentina Top 10 is a record chart published weekly by CAPIF (Cámara Argentina de Productores de Fonogramas y Videogramas), a nonprofit organization integrated by multinational and independent record companies.

Albums

References

Argentina Albums
Argentine record charts